In mathematics a P-recursive equation can be solved for polynomial solutions. Sergei A. Abramov in 1989 and Marko Petkovšek in 1992 described an algorithm which finds all polynomial solutions of those recurrence equations with polynomial coefficients. The algorithm computes a degree bound for the solution in a first step. In a second step an ansatz for a polynomial of this degree is used and the unknown coefficients are computed by a system of linear equations. This article describes this algorithm.

In 1995 Abramov, Bronstein and Petkovšek showed that the polynomial case can be solved more efficiently by considering power series solution of the recurrence equation in a specific power basis (i.e. not the ordinary basis ).

Other algorithms which compute rational or hypergeometric solutions of a linear recurrence equation with polynomial coefficients also use algorithms which compute polynomial solutions.

Degree bound 
Let  be a field of characteristic zero and   a recurrence equation of order  with polynomial coefficients , polynomial right-hand side  and unknown polynomial sequence . Moreover letfor  where  denotes the falling factorial and  the set of nonnegative integers. Then . This is called a degree bound for the polynomial solution . This bound was shown by Abramov and Petkovšek.

Algorithm 
The algorithm consists of two steps. In a first step the degree bound is computed. This is called the method undetermined coefficients. The algorithm returns the general polynomial solution of a recurrence equation.
 algorithm polynomial_solutions is
     input: Linear recurrence equation .
     output: The general polynomial solution  if there are any solutions, otherwise false.
 
     for  do
         
     repeat
     
     
     
     
      with unknown coefficients  for 
     if there are possible values for  then
         return general solution 
     else
         return false
     end if

Example 
Applying the formula for the degree bound on the recurrence equationover  yields . Plugging this ansatz into the original recurrence equation leads toThis is equivalent to the following system of linear equationswith the solution .

References 

Polynomials